Lenox Avenue Breakdown is an album by jazz saxophonist Arthur Blythe. It was released by Columbia Records in 1979 and reissued by Koch Jazz in 1998. The album reached No. 35 on the Billboard Jazz Albums chart in 1979.

Reception 

The Penguin Guide to Jazz included Lenox Avenue Breakdown in its "Core Collection," and assigned its "crown" accolade to the album, along with a four-star rating (of a possible four stars).  Penguin editors Richard Cook and Brian Morton called the album "one of the lost masterpieces of modern jazz," owing to its long period of unavailability before the 1998 CD release.  Cook and Morton noted that "[Bob] Stewart's long tuba solo on the title-piece is one of the few genuinely important tuba statements in jazz, a nimble sermon that promises storms and sunshine."

Thom Jurek, writing for AllMusic, notes that "this group lays like a band that had been together for years, not the weeklong period it took them to rehearse and create one of Blythe's masterpieces. Over 20 years later, Lenox Avenue Breakdown still sounds new and different and ranks among the three finest albums in his catalog."

Track listing
All compositions by Arthur Blythe.
Original LP side one
 "Down San Diego Way" – 7:44
 "Lenox Avenue Breakdown" – 13:11
Original LP side two
 "Slidin' Through" – 9:33
 "Odessa" – 9:30

Personnel
 Arthur Blythe – alto saxophone, mixing
 James Newton – flute
 Bob Stewart – tuba
 James "Blood" Ulmer – guitar
 Cecil McBee – bass
 Jack DeJohnette – drums
 Guillermo Franco – percussion
 Bob Thiele – producer, mixing
 Doug Epstein – engineer, mixing
 Carl Beatty and Lincoln Clapp – assistant engineers
 Vladimir Meller – mastering
 Gene Greif – design
 Mark Hess – illustration
 Jim Houghton – photography
 Stanley Crouch – liner notes
 Donald Elfman – reissue producer
 Nicole Cavalluzzo – reissue design

Release history

References

Arthur Blythe albums
1979 albums
Albums produced by Bob Thiele
Columbia Records albums